Lawrence Chandler is an American composer, musician, producer and artist living in London. He is best known for his work as a founding member of the band Bowery Electric.

Biography
Following Bowery Electric's final tour in 2000 Chandler took a hiatus during which time he studied composition privately with La Monte Young and Pauline Oliveros, with Conrad Cummings at The Juilliard School, worked for Philip Glass and completed a Master of Music in Composition from Goldsmiths College.

He returned in 2009 with Everybody Here Is Fine, commissioned for Make Music New York and premiered at The Bell House, Brooklyn on 21 June 2009.

Subsequent works include Music for Rock Ensemble, commissioned for "50 Years of Minimalism", premiered by Katia and Marielle Labèque, Chandler and ensemble at Kings Place, London on 26 November 2011 and The Tuning of the World, a realisation of his evolving 24-hour, 24 part, sustained tone composition, for octet, with tuned sine wave generators, released by Untitled Recordings on 1 March 2012. In 2013 he formed Happy Families with his partner Lucia Rivero.

Other musical activities
Dream House (1994–1996, 2008), monitor, light and sound installation by La Monte Young and Marian Zazeela
 Experimental Audio Research (EAR) (1996), collaboration with Pete Kember, Kevin Shields and others, live performance at Westbeth Theater Center, New York on 3 September 1996
Brooklyn Rider Plays Philip Glass by Brooklyn Rider (2008), assistant engineer, The Looking Glass Studio, New York
Philip Glass Soundtracks by Michael Riesman (2008), assisted, The Looking Glass Studio, New York
Meredith Monk Basket Rondo World Premiere (2007), live sound, Paula Cooper Gallery, New York
Deep Listening (2009), workshop with Pauline Oliveros, Dartington International Summer School, near Totnes
Perfect Sound Forever (2017), guest DJ, NTS Radio, London on 18 October 2017

References

Living people
American male classical composers
American classical composers
Experimental composers
American electronic musicians
Juilliard School alumni
Pupils of La Monte Young
1961 births
20th-century American composers
20th-century American male musicians